Philomena Mensah (born May 11, 1975) is a Canadian sprinter. Born in Accra, she previously represented Ghana, but emigrated to Canada following the 1994 Commonwealth Games. She won the bronze medal in the 60 metres event at the 1999 IAAF World Indoor Championships, after having set a personal best in the heats with 7.02 seconds.

International competitions
1999 IAAF World Indoor Championships - bronze medal (60 m)
1998 Commonwealth Games - silver medal (100 m)
1994 African Junior Athletics Championships - gold medal (100 m)
1994 African Junior Athletics Championships - bronze medal (200 m)
1994 World Junior Championships in Athletics - bronze medal (100 m)

External links
 
  (archived PDF)
 

1975 births
Living people
Ghanaian female sprinters
Canadian female sprinters
Sportspeople from Accra
Black Canadian track and field athletes
Ghanaian emigrants to Canada
Pan American Games track and field athletes for Canada
Athletes (track and field) at the 1999 Pan American Games
Commonwealth Games competitors for Ghana
Athletes (track and field) at the 1994 Commonwealth Games
Commonwealth Games medallists in athletics
Athletes (track and field) at the 1998 Commonwealth Games
World Athletics Championships athletes for Ghana
World Athletics Championships athletes for Canada
World Athletics Indoor Championships medalists
Black Canadian sportswomen
Commonwealth Games silver medallists for Canada
Medallists at the 1998 Commonwealth Games